Igor Nikolayevich Dolmatov (born 22 January 1970 in Nizhny Tagil) is a former Russian football player.

References

1970 births
People from Nizhny Tagil
Living people
Soviet footballers
FC Uralets Nizhny Tagil players
Russian footballers
FC Tyumen players
Russian Premier League players
Russian expatriate footballers
Expatriate footballers in Kazakhstan
Association football defenders
FC Iskra Smolensk players
Sportspeople from Sverdlovsk Oblast